Mr. Simpatia is the second studio album by Italian rapper Fabri Fibra. It was released on 1 September 2004 by Vibrarecords.

Track listing

In popular culture 
This album is considered to be one of the most important italian hip hop albums.  The rapper Madman quoted it in his first album Escape from Heart , in the track Trash Music: 

E non so niente a memoria, nemmeno l'Ave Maria – And I don't know anything by heart, not even the Ave Maria

Ma so qualcosa di storia tipo Mr. Simpatia – But I know something about history, like Mr. Simpatia

In this verse, Madman says that like a Christian knows by heart the Ave Maria and other prayers, MadMan knows by heart some records that have made the history of Italian rap, which for him is religion.

Charts

Certifications

References

2004 albums
Fabri Fibra albums
Hardcore hip hop albums
Comedy hip hop albums